Grace Adelaide Hartman (born Grace Barrett; January 7, 1907 – August 8, 1955) was an American stage and musical theatre actress.

Biography 
She was born in San Francisco, California. She was married to actor Paul Hartman from 1923 until they divorced in 1951. She died in Van Nuys, California, in 1955. 

In 1949, Hartman and her husband co-starred in The Hartmans, a comedy series on NBC-TV.

Death
She died from cancer on August 8, 1955, aged forty eight.

Productions
Ballyhoo of 1932 (September 6, 1932 – November 26, 1932)
Red, Hot and Blue (October 29, 1936 – April 10, 1937)
Keep 'em Laughing (April 24, 1942 – May 28, 1942)
Top-Notchers (May 29, 1942 – June 20, 1942)
Sketches by Grace Hartman (December 11, 1947 – September 4, 1948)
Angel in the Wings (January 22, 1949 – May 7, 1949)
Tickets, Please! (April 27, 1950 – November 25, 1950)

Filmography

Awards
She won a Tony Award for Best Leading Actress in a Musical for her role in Angel in the Wings.

References

External links

1907 births
1955 deaths
20th-century American actresses
American musical theatre actresses
American stage actresses
American film actresses
American television actresses
Tony Award winners
Actresses from San Francisco
People from Greater Los Angeles
Actresses from California
Deaths from cancer in California
20th-century American singers
20th-century American women singers